Down by the Hipster (DBTH) is a New York City nightlife blog.

Down by the Hipster has been cited by other New York City blogs such as Eater.com and New York magazine's food and restaurant blog Grub Street, as well as print publications such as the New York Post and Blackbook magazine.

Down by the Hipster has been credited with breaking news stories such as Heath Ledger's involvement in opening the bar and cafe Five Leaves in Brooklyn, New York.

References

Sources
New York magazine, July 2008
TMZ.com, July 24, 2008

External links
Official website

Internet properties with year of establishment missing
American blogs
American entertainment news websites
Nightlife in New York City